Caprara can refer to:
Aeneas de Caprara, Austrian field marshal
Giovanni Battista Caprara, Italian statesman and cardinal
Palais Caprara-Geymüller, a palace in Vienna

See also
Prati di Caprara, an urban forest in Bologna